William Eggleston (born July 27, 1939) is an American photographer. He is widely credited with increasing recognition for color photography as a legitimate artistic medium. Eggleston's books include William Eggleston's Guide (1976) and The Democratic Forest (1989).

Early years 
William Eggleston was born in Memphis, Tennessee and raised in Sumner, Mississippi. His father was an engineer and his mother was the daughter of a prominent local judge. As a boy, Eggleston was introverted; he enjoyed playing the piano, drawing, and working with electronics. From an early age, he was also drawn to visual media and reportedly enjoyed buying postcards and cutting out pictures from magazines.

At the age of 15, Eggleston was sent to the Webb School, a boarding establishment. Eggleston later recalled few fond memories of the school, telling a reporter, "It had a kind of Spartan routine to 'build character'. I never knew what that was supposed to mean. It was so callous and dumb. It was the kind of place where it was considered effeminate to like music and painting." Eggleston was unusual among his peers in eschewing the traditional Southern male pursuits of hunting and sports, in favor of artistic pursuits and observation of the world. Nevertheless, Eggleston noted that he never felt like an outsider. "I never had the feeling that I didn't fit in," he told a reporter, "But probably I didn't."

Eggleston attended Vanderbilt University for a year, Delta State College for a semester, and the University of Mississippi for about five years, but did not complete any degree. Nonetheless, his interest in photography took root when a friend at Vanderbilt gave Eggleston a Leica camera. He was introduced to abstract expressionism at Ole Miss by visiting painter Tom Young.

Artistic development 
Eggleston's early photographic efforts were inspired by the work of Swiss-born photographer Robert Frank, and by French photographer Henri Cartier-Bresson's book, The Decisive Moment. Eggleston later recalled that the book was "the first serious book I found, from many awful books...I didn't understand it a bit, and then it sank in, and I realized, my God, this is a great one." First photographing in black-and-white, Eggleston began experimenting with color in 1965 and 1966 after being introduced to the format by William Christenberry. Color transparency film became his dominant medium in the later 1960s. Eggleston's development as a photographer seems to have taken place in relative isolation from other artists. In an interview, John Szarkowski describes his first encounter with the young Eggleston in 1969 as being "absolutely out of the blue". After reviewing Eggleston's work (which he recalled as a suitcase full of "drugstore" color prints) Szarkowski prevailed upon the Photography Committee of MoMA to buy one of Eggleston's photographs.

In 1970, Eggleston's friend William Christenberry introduced him to Walter Hopps, director of Washington, D.C.'s Corcoran Gallery. Hopps later reported being "stunned" by Eggleston's work: "I had never seen anything like it."

Eggleston taught at Harvard in 1973 and 1974, and it was during these years that he discovered dye-transfer printing; he was examining the price list of a photographic lab in Chicago when he read about the process. As Eggleston later recalled: "It advertised 'from the cheapest to the ultimate print.' The ultimate print was a dye transfer. I went straight up there to look and everything I saw was commercial work like pictures of cigarette packs or perfume bottles but the color saturation and the quality of the ink were overwhelming. I couldn't wait to see what a plain Eggleston picture would look like with the same process. Every photograph I subsequently printed with the process seemed fantastic and each one seemed better than the previous one." The dye-transfer process resulted in some of Eggleston's most striking and famous work, such as his 1973 photograph entitled The Red Ceiling, of which Eggleston said, "The Red Ceiling is so powerful, that in fact, I've never seen it reproduced on the page to my satisfaction. When you look at the dye it is like red blood that's wet on the wall... A little red is usually enough, but to work with an entire red surface was a challenge."

At Harvard, Eggleston prepared his first portfolio, entitled 14 Pictures (1974). Eggleston's work was exhibited at MoMA in 1976. Although this was over three decades after MoMa had mounted a solo exhibition of color photographs by Eliot Porter, and a decade after MoMA had exhibited color photographs by Ernst Haas, the tale that the Eggleston exhibition was MoMA's first exhibition of color photography is frequently repeated, and the 1976 show is regarded as a watershed moment in the history of photography, by marking "the acceptance of colour photography by the highest validating institution" (in the words of Mark Holborn).

Around the time of his 1976 MoMA exhibition, Eggleston was introduced to Viva, the Andy Warhol "superstar", with whom he began a long relationship. During this period Eggleston became familiar with Andy Warhol's circle, a connection that may have helped foster Eggleston's idea of the "democratic camera", Mark Holborn suggests. Also in the 1970s, Eggleston experimented with video, producing several hours of roughly edited footage Eggleston calls Stranded in Canton. Writer Richard Woodward, who has viewed the footage, likens it to a "demented home movie", mixing tender shots of his children at home with shots of drunken parties, public urination, and a man biting off a chicken's head before a cheering crowd in New Orleans. Woodward suggests that the film is reflective of Eggleston's "fearless naturalism—a belief that by looking patiently at what others ignore or look away from, interesting things can be seen."

Eggleston's published books and portfolios include Los Alamos (completed in 1974, but published much later), William Eggleston's Guide (the catalog of the 1976 MoMa exhibit), the massive Election Eve (1977; a portfolio of photographs taken around Plains, Georgia, the rural seat of Jimmy Carter before the 1976 presidential election), The Morals of Vision (1978), Flowers (1978), Wedgwood Blue (1979), Seven (1979), Troubled Waters (1980), The Louisiana Project (1980), William Eggleston's Graceland (1984; a series of commissioned photographs of Elvis Presley's Graceland, depicting the singer's home as an airless, windowless tomb in custom-made bad taste), The Democratic Forest (1989), Faulkner's Mississippi (1990), and Ancient and Modern (1992).

Some of his early series were not shown until the late 2000s. The Nightclub Portraits (1973), a series of large black-and-white portraits in bars and clubs around Memphis was, for the most part, not shown until 2005. Lost and Found, part of Eggleston's Los Alamos series, is a body of photographs that have remained unseen for decades because until 2008 no one knew that they belonged to Walter Hopps; the works from this series chronicle road trips the artist took with Hopps, leaving from Memphis and traveling as far as the West Coast. Eggleston's Election Eve photographs were not editioned until 2011.

Eggleston also worked with filmmakers, photographing the set of John Huston's film Annie (1982) and documenting the making of David Byrne's film True Stories (1986).

In 2017, an album of Eggleston's music was released, Musik. It comprises 13 "experimental electronic soundscapes", "often dramatic improvisations on compositions by Bach (his hero) and Handel as well as his singular takes on a Gilbert and Sullivan tune and the jazz standard On the Street Where You Live." Musik was made entirely on a 1980s Korg synthesiser, and recorded to floppy disks. The 2017 compilation Musik was produced by Tom Lunt, and released on Secretly Canadian. In 2018, Áine O'Dwyer performed the music on a pipe organ at the Big Ears music festival in Knoxville.

Eggleston's aesthetic 
Eggleston's mature work is characterized by its ordinary subject matter. As Eudora Welty noted in her introduction to The Democratic Forest, an Eggleston photograph might include "old tires, Dr. Pepper machines, discarded air-conditioners, vending machines, empty and dirty Coca-Cola bottles, torn posters, power poles and power wires, street barricades, one-way signs, detour signs, No Parking signs, parking meters, and palm trees crowding the same curb."

Eudora Welty suggests that Eggleston sees the complexity and beauty of the mundane world: "The extraordinary, compelling, honest, beautiful and unsparing photographs all have to do with the quality of our lives in the everyday world: they succeed in showing us the grain of the present, like the cross-section of a tree... They focus on the mundane world. But no subject is fuller of implications than the mundane world!" Mark Holborn, in his introduction to Ancient and Modern, writes about the dark undercurrent of these mundane scenes as viewed through Eggleston's lens: "[Eggleston's] subjects are, on the surface, the ordinary inhabitants and environs of suburban Memphis and Mississippi—friends, family, barbecues, back yards, a tricycle and the clutter of the mundane. The normality of these subjects is deceptive, for behind the images there is a sense of lurking danger." American artist Edward Ruscha said of Eggleston's work, "When you see a picture he's taken, you're stepping into some kind of jagged world that seems like Eggleston World."

According to Philip Gefter from Art & Auction, "It is worth noting that Stephen Shore and William Eggleston, pioneers of color photography in the early 1970s, borrowed, consciously or not, from the photorealists. Their photographic interpretation of the American vernacular—gas stations, diners, parking lots—is foretold in photorealist paintings that preceded their pictures."

Publications 
 Election Eve. New York City: Caldecot Chubb, 1977. Artist book. Two volumes. Edition of five copies.
 Göttingen: Steidl; 2017. . One volume.
 Morals of Vision. New York City: Caldecot Chubb, 1978. Artist book. Edition of fifteen copies.
 Göttingen: Steidl; 2018. .
 Flowers. New York City: Caldecot Chubb, 1978. Artist book. Edition of fifteen copies.
 Göttingen: Steidl; 2019. .
 William Eggleston's Guide. New York: Museum of Modern Art, 1976. .
 The Democratic Forest.
 London: Secker & Warburg, 1989. With an introduction by Eudora Welty and an afterword by Eggleston and Mark Holborn.
 New York: Doubleday, 1989. . With an introduction by Welty and an afterword by Eggleston and Mark Holborn.
 Expanded edition. Göttingen: Steidl, 2015. . Ten volume set, 1328 pages, 1010 photographs.
 The Democratic Forest: Selected Works. New York: David Zwirner; Göttingen: Steidl, 2016. . 68 photographs.
 Faulkner's Mississippi. Birmingham: Oxmoor House, 1990. . With a text by Willie Morris.
 Ancient and Modern. New York: Random House, 1992. . With an introduction by Mark Holborn.
 Horses and Dogs. Washington and London: Smithsonian Institution, 1994. . Essay by Richard B. Woodward.
 The Hasselblad Award 1998: William Eggleston. Zurich: Scalo; Goteborg: Hasselblad Center, 1999. . Edited by Gunilla Knape. With essays by Walter Hopps and Thomas Weski, and a transcript of an interview with Ute Eskildsen.
 William Eggleston. Göttingen: Steidl; Paris: Foundation Cartier, 2001. . Bilingual (French and English).
 Los Alamos. Zurich: Scalo Publishers, 2003. . With a text by Walter Hopps and Thomas Weski.
 2 . Santa Fe: Twin Palms Publishers, 1999, 2008, 2011. . With a text by Bruce Wagner.
 The Spirit of Dunkerque.
 Paris: Biro, 2006. .
 Corte Madera, CA: Gingko, 2009. With a text by Vincent Gerard and Jean-pierre Rehm.
 5 × 7. Santa Fe: Twin Palms Publishers, 2007. . With an essay by Michael Almereyda.
 William Eggleston: Democratic Camera, Photographs and Video, 1961–2008. With a text by Elisabeth Sussman, Thomas Weski, Tina Kukielski, and Stanley Booth. Exhibition catalog.
 New York: Whitney Museum of American Art, 2008.
 New Haven, CT: Yale University, 2008. .
 Paris. Göttingen: Steidl, 2009. .
 Before Color. Göttingen: Steidl, 2010. .
 For Now. Santa Fe: Twin Palms Publishing, 2010. . Afterword by Michael Almereyda; short texts, "Eggleston, 1971" by Lloyd Fonvielle, "In Conversation with William Eggleston" by Kristina McKenna, "Two Women and One Man" by Greil Marcus, "Night Vision: The Cinema of William Eggleston" by Any Taubin, and a longer text "It Never Entered My Mind": (Answers to 11 frequently asked questions about William Eggleston in the Real World)" by Michael Almereyda.
 Chromes. Göttingen: Steidl, 2011. .
 Los Alamos Revisited. Göttingen: Steidl, 2012. .
 From Black & White to Color. Göttingen: Steidl, 2014. . With an introduction by Agnès Sire ("The Invention of a Language"), essay by Thomas Weski.
 At Zenith. Göttingen: Steidl, 2014. .
 Polaroid SX-70. Göttingen: Steidl, 2019. .
 The Outlands. Steidl, 2021. ISBN 978-3-95829-265-9 
 The Outlands, Selected Works. David Zwirner Books, 2022. ISBN-10 1644230771 
 Mystery of the Ordinary. Steidl, 2023. ISBN 978-3-96999-220-3

Photographs in notable publications 
The earliest commercial use of Eggleston's art was on album covers for the Memphis group Big Star, with whom Eggleston recorded for the album Third/Sister Lovers and who used his photograph of a red ceiling on their album Radio City. Eggleston's photograph of dolls on a Cadillac hood featured on the cover of the Alex Chilton album Like Flies on Sherbert. The Primal Scream album Give Out But Don't Give Up features a cropped photograph of a neon Confederate flag and a palm tree by Eggleston. In 1994, Eggleston allowed his long-time friend and fellow photographer Terry Manning to use two Eggleston photographs for the front and back covers of the CD release of Christopher Idylls, an album of ethereal acoustic guitar music produced by Manning and performed by another friend of Eggleston, Gimmer Nicholson.

In 2006, an Eggleston image was coincidentally used as both the cover to Primal Scream's single "Country Girl" and the paperback edition of Ali Smith's novel The Accidental. The same picture had already been used on the cover of Chuck Prophet's Age of Miracles album in 2004.

In 2001, Eggleston's photograph "Memphis (1968)" was used as the cover of Jimmy Eat World's top-selling album Bleed American. Eggleston's photos also appear on Tanglewood Numbers by the Silver Jews, Joanna Newsom and the Ys Street Band by Joanna Newsom, Transference by Spoon and Delta Kream by The Black Keys.

Films

Documentary appearances 
 William Eggleston in the Real World (2005), by Michael Almereyda.
 By the Ways: A Journey with William Eggleston (2007), directed by Vincent Gérard and Cédric Laty – selected for the Grand Jury Prize at Sundance Film Festival in 2006.
 The Colourful Mr. Eggleston (2009), directed by Jack Cocker and Reiner Holzemer – an episode of the Imagine (TV series) for BBC One.
 The Source (2012), by Doug Aitken.
 Big Star: Nothing Can Hurt Me (2013), directed by Drew DeNicola and Olivia Mori.

Movie and series appearances 
 Great Balls of Fire (1989), directed by Jim McBride – Eggleston plays Jerry Lee Lewis's father, Elmo Lewis.
 Restless, x-ray technician (2011), as himself.
 Today (TV Series) (episode dated 31 May 2011), as himself.
 Sunday Morning (A Father and Daughter's Artistic Collaboration, 2016)

Music 
 Musik (Secretly Canadian, 2017) – produced by Tom Lunt

Exhibitions 

 1999–2000: William Eggleston and the Color Tradition, J. Paul Getty Museum, Los Angeles.
 2001–2002: William Eggleston, Fondation Cartier, Paris. Traveled to Hayward Gallery, London.
 2002: documenta 11, Kassel, Germany.
 2002: William Eggleston: Los Alamos, Museum Ludwig, Cologne, Germany. Traveled to Serralves Foundation, Portugal; Norwegian Museum of Contemporary Art, Oslo, Norway; Louisiana Museum of Modern Art, Humlebaek, Denmark; Albertina, Vienna, Austria; and San Francisco Museum of Modern Art, San Francisco, California; Dallas Museum of Art, Dallas, Texas through 2005).
 2008: William Eggleston: Democratic Camera, Photographs and Video 1961–2008, Whitney Museum of American Art, New York. Co-organized with Haus der Kunst, Munich; Corcoran Gallery, Washington, D.C.; Art Institute of Chicago; and the Los Angeles County Museum of Art.
 2012: New Dyes, Rose Gallery, Santa Monica, California
 2016: William Eggleston: Selections from the Wilson Centre for Photography, Portland Art Museum, Portland.
 2016: William Eggleston Portraits, National Portrait Gallery, London.
 2017: William Eggleston: Los Alamos, Foam Fotografiemuseum Amsterdam.
 2023: William Eggleston . Mystery of the Ordinary, C/O Berlin, Berlin, Germany

Awards 
 1974: Guggenheim Fellowship
 1975: Photographer's Fellowship, National Endowment for the Arts
 1978: Survey Grant, National Endowment for the Arts, for a survey of Mississippi cotton farms using photography and color video
 1989: "54 Master Photographers of 1960-1979" Award, Photographic Society of Japan
 1995: Distinguished Achievement Award, University of Memphis
 1998: Hasselblad Award, Hasselblad Foundation, Gothenburg, Sweden
 2003: Special 150th Anniversary Medal and Honorary Fellowship (HonFRPS), Royal Photographic Society, London
 2004: Getty Images Lifetime Achievement Award at the International Center of Photography (ICP)
 2013: Outstanding Contribution to Photography Award, Sony World Photography Awards, World Photography Organisation, London.

Collections 
Eggleston's work is held in the following public collections:
Art Institute of Chicago, Chicago, IL
J. Paul Getty Museum, Los Angeles, CA
 Museum of Modern Art, New York City
 Pier 24 Photography, San Francisco
 San Francisco Museum of Modern Art, San Francisco, CA
 Whitney Museum of American Art, New York City
 International Photography Hall of Fame, St.Louis, MO

Art market 
In 2012, three dozen of Eggleston's larger-format prints –  instead of the original format of  – sold for $5.9 million in an auction at Christie's to benefit the Eggleston Artistic Trust, an organization dedicated to the preservation of the artist's work. The top lot, Untitled 1970, set a world auction record for a single print by the photographer at $578,000.

New York art collector Jonathan Sobel, subsequently filed a lawsuit in United States District Court for the Southern District of New York against Eggleston, alleging that the artist's decision to print and sell oversized versions of some of his famous images in an auction has diluted the rarity—and therefore the resale value—of the originals. The court later dismissed the lawsuit.

Notes

References

Sources 
 Eggleston, William (1989). The Democratic Forest. Introduction by Eudora Welty. New York: Doubleday. .
 Eggleston, William & Morris, William (1990). Faulkner's Mississippi. Birmingham: Oxmoor House. .
 Eggleston, William (1992). Ancient and Modern. Introduction by Mark Holborn. New York: Random House. .
 Lindgren, Carl Edwin. (1993 Summer). "Ancient and modern". Review of Ancient and Modern by William Eggleston. Number, Volume 19:20–21.
 Lindgren, Carl Edwin. (1993). "Enigmatic presence". Review of Ancient and Modern by William Eggleston. RSA Journal (Journal of the Roy. Soc. of Arts), Volume 141 Number 5439, 404.
 Woodward, Richard B. (October 1991). "Memphis Beau". Vanity Fair.
 Eggleston Trust bio

External links 
 
 Where World View and World Lines Converge in Fillip
 
 

1939 births
Living people
People from Memphis, Tennessee
People from Sumner, Mississippi
Harvard University staff
Photographers from Mississippi
Photographers from Tennessee
University of Mississippi alumni
Vanderbilt University alumni
Webb School (Bell Buckle, Tennessee) alumni
Fine art photographers
20th-century American photographers
21st-century American photographers
Secretly Canadian artists